Diplobelus is a genus of belemnite, an extinct group of cephalopods.

See also

 Belemnite
 List of belemnites

References

Belemnites